Atlanta's second Union Station was built in 1871 on the site of the 1853 station, burned in mid November 1864 when Federal forces left Atlanta for the March to the Sea. It was built in Second Empire style, designed by architect Max Corput. It was located at what is now Wall Street between Pryor Street and Central Avenue.

It was replaced by the 1930 Union Station three blocks northwest and one block southwest.

As of 2011, a parking structure is located on the site of the 1853 and 1871 stations.

Notable people 
Philanthropist Carrie Steele Logan worked at the station as a matron for many years.

References

 
 
 

Former railway stations in Georgia (U.S. state)
Railway stations in Atlanta
Railway stations in Georgia (U.S. state)
Union stations in the United States
Railway stations in the United States opened in 1871
Railway stations closed in 1930
Demolished railway stations in the United States
Demolished buildings and structures in Atlanta
Max Corput buildings
Second Empire architecture in Georgia (U.S. state)
1871 establishments in Georgia (U.S. state)
1930 disestablishments in Georgia (U.S. state)